The 1950 Central Michigan Chippewas football team represented Central Michigan College of Education, later renamed Central Michigan University, in the Interstate Intercollegiate Athletic Conference (IIAC) during the 1950 college football season. In their first and only season under head coach Warren Schmakel, the Chippewas compiled a 6–4 record (2–2 against IIAC opponents) and outscored all opponents by a combined total of 209 to 125.

Three Central Michigan players (quarterback Andy MacDonald, end John Partenio, and tackle Jim Schultz) received first-team honors on the All-IIAC team. McDonald broke Central's passing record and led the country's small colleges in passes completed, yards gained, and percentage of completions.

Coach Schmakel resigned after the 1950 season to accept a coaching position at Miami of Ohio. Shmakel was Central Michigan's fourth head football coach in six years. The assistant coaches for the 1950 season were Bill Theunissen, James Jones, Doc Sweeney (line coach, 12th year), Al Thomas, and Bob Bentley.

Schedule

See also
 1950 in Michigan

References

Central Michigan
Central Michigan Chippewas football seasons
Central Michigan Chippewas football